Bled is a 2009 horror film directed by Christopher Hutson and starring Sarah Farooqui, Chris Ivan Cevic, Alex Petrovitch, Michele Morrow, and Ivan Moody. It was written by Sxv'leithan Essex. The film released direct to DVD on April 7, 2009.

Premise
Sai, a young artist living in a downtown warehouse delves into an ancient world of blood and lust. An enigmatic foreigner seduces her to try a long forgotten drug making her the prey of a dimensional vampire who needs her newfound hunger for blood to cross over from his world to hers.

Cast

References

External links
 
 
 
 

2009 films
2009 horror films
American vampire films
2000s English-language films
2000s American films